More are a British heavy metal band who were part of the new wave of British heavy metal scene in the early 1980s. They recorded two albums and two singles, and opened the German rock festival 'Golden Summer Night' at Stuttgart and Darmstadt in August 1981, as well as the 'Monsters of Rock' festival at Donington Park one week later.

Career
Initially the band More was fronted by vocalist Paul Mario Day, who had sung in an early incarnation of Iron Maiden. By the time of their second album, Frank Darch and Laurie Mansworth had left, the latter going on to form the band Airrace. Andy John Burton was recruited as the new drummer and the band became a four-piece. Bassist Brian Day also left during the recording of the second album, to be replaced by Barry 'Baz' Nicholls.

Following Paul Mario Day's subsequent departure from the band, the line-up of Cox, Nicholls, Burton and vocalist Mick Stratton released a 7" single called "Trickster" in 1982, before splitting up.

Kenny Cox revived More briefly in 1985, with vocalist Ron Jackson, guitarist Mel Jones, bassist Baz Nicholls, and Paul George on drums. Following that, Kenny Cox moved on to the band Mammoth, with ex-Gillan and Sun Red Sun bassist John McCoy and ex-Samson vocalist Nicky Moore.

A further attempt to reform the band occurred in the spring of 1998, with Mike Freeland featuring on vocals. A track called "My Obsession" was recorded by this incarnation of the band, but they split up shortly afterwards in the year 2000.

In 2011, Andy John Burton recruited Baz Nicholls (bass; joined More in 1982), Mike Freeland (vocals; part of More's 1999 line-up), Paul Stickles (guitar; also with the band Dangerous Breed) and special guest Chris Tsangarides to form a More tribute band called Exmore. They performed live at the 'Headbangers Open Air' festival in July 2011, with a warm-up show taking place at the Astor Theatre in Deal, Kent, plus a post-festival club show the following Sunday. Following an enthusiastic reaction from the audience at this concert, the bandmembers made the collective decision to continue performing.

Exmore played a co-headlining show with Marseille at the Sir Robert Peel venue in Kingston upon Thames, Surrey on 15 October 2011.

The following year, the band changed their name to More 2012  and scheduled further shows, including: 26 May at the Railway venue in Bolton,  23 November at the Red Lion pub in Gravesend, Kent, and 1 December at the 'Hard Rock Hell VI' festival, with Steve Rix on drums.

An appearance at the 'Metalwave UK' festival in Purfleet, Essex, alongside Praying Mantis, Dennis Stratton, Cloven Hoof, Chariot and Deep Machine, took place on 5 October 2013, followed by a performance at the 'Heavy Metal Maniacs' festival in Amstelveen on 19 October 2013.

In May 2014, Dave John Ross replaced Paul Stickles on guitar. Further concert appearances were then scheduled for the 'Bang Your Head!!!' festival in Balingen on 12 July 2014, and the 'Hard Rock Hell VII' festival in Pwllheli on 15 November 2014.

In 2015, the band played at the 'Legends of Rock' festival in Great Yarmouth and the 'Hard Rock Hell VIII' festival in Pwllheli. 

In November and December 2016, the band undertook a short European tour as special guests of German band Bonfire, taking in shows in Belgium, Germany and Holland.

Chris Tsangarides passed away on 6 January 2018, and Andy John Burton died on 7 November 2021. Kenny Cox passed away on 21 June 2022.

In March 2022, a revamped More announced the recruitment of Polish vocalist Roman Kańtoch (ex-Kruk), who replaced Mike Freeland in the new line-up.

Line-ups
First line-up (1980–1981)
Paul Mario Day - Vocals
Kenny Cox - Guitar
Paul Todd - Guitar
Brian Day - Bass
Frank Darch - Drums

Second line-up (1981–1982)
Paul Mario Day - Vocals
Kenny Cox - Guitar
Laurie Mansworth - Guitar
Brian Day - Bass
Andy John Burton - Drums

Third line-up (1982)
Mick Stratton - Vocals
Kenny Cox - Guitar
Brian Day - Bass
Andy John Burton - Drums

Fourth line-up (1982)
Mick Stratton - Vocals
Kenny Cox - Guitar
Baz Nicholls - Bass
Andy John Burton - Drums

Fifth line-up (1985)
Ron Jackson - Vocals
Kenny Cox - Guitar
Mel Jones - Guitar
Baz Nicholls - Bass
Paul George - Drums

Sixth line-up (1998–2000)
Mike Freeland - Vocals
Kenny Cox - Guitar
Baz Nicholls - Bass
Rick Dyat / Andy Robinson - Drums

Exmore line-up (2011–2012)
Mike Freeland - Vocals
Chris Tsangarides - Guitar
Paul Stickles - Guitar
Baz Nicholls - Bass
Andy John Burton - Drums

More 2012 line-up (2012-2018)
Mike Freeland - Vocals
Chris Tsangarides - Guitar
Paul Stickles / Dave John Ross - Guitar
Baz Nicholls - Bass
Steve Rix - Drums

Ninth line-up (2022-present)
Roman Kańtoch - Vocals
Dave John Ross - Guitar
Baz Nicholls - Bass
Steve Rix - Drums

Discography

Albums
Warhead (Atlantic Records, 1981)
"Warhead" - 3:47
"Fire" (The Crazy World of Arthur Brown cover) - 3:31
"Soldier" - 4:52
"Depression" - 5:00
"Road Rocket" - 3:54
"Lord of Twilight" - 4:48
"Way of the World" - 3:42
"We are the Band" - 4:30
"I Have No Answers" - 5:42
Total length: 39:46

Blood & Thunder (Atlantic Records, 1982)
"Killer on the Prowl" - 5:11
"Blood & Thunder" - 3:46
"I Just Can't Believe It" - 4:16
"I've Been Waiting" - 3:21
"Traitors Gate" - 4:11
"Rock and Roll" - 4:30
"I Wanna Take You" - 3:15
"Go Home" - 3:15
"The Eye" - 2:40
"Nightmare" - 6:10
Total length: 40:35

Singles
"We Are the Band" / "Atomic Rock" (Atlantic Records, 1981) - UK No. 59
"Trickster" / "Hey Joe" (Atlantic Records, 1982)

See also
List of new wave of British heavy metal bands

References

External links
 Official Facebook page
 Unofficial Myspace
 Information about More
 An extended biography of More

English rock music groups
English heavy metal musical groups
Musical groups established in 1980
Musical quartets
New Wave of British Heavy Metal musical groups
Musical groups from London